Krishnagiri Village is a village in Wayanad District in the state of Kerala, India. It is in a rural area of Wayanad and  one of the 15 villages in Sultan Bathery Tehsil.

Demographics
According to the census 2011, Krishnagiri village had a population of 12952. 6489 male and 6463 female. Total family residing in village is 3229. As per census, there are 1212 children in 2011.

Location
NH766 is the major road passing through Krishnagiri village and it has a very good connectivity with south Indian states. The NH 766 connecting it to Mysore, Bangalore and Kozhikode. One state highway connected to Ooty and Coimbatore from Sulthan Bathery. The Periya ghat road connects Mananthavady to Kannur and Thalassery. The Kuttiady mountain road connects Vatakara with Kalpetta and Mananthavady.

Cricket stadium
The stadium is South India's first high altitude 'table top' stadium. It is owned by Kerala Cricket Association and about 20,000 people can be accommodated in this stadium. It has a scientifically constructed drainage system, which can drain out rain water very quickly in case of rain and match can be resumed in 20 minutes after rain. On 18 August 2015, it hosted an international test cricket match between 'A' teams of India and South Africa, which was the first international cricket match conducted in this stadium. Also some of the Ranji Trophy tournaments conducted in this ground.

References 

Sultan Bathery area
Villages in Wayanad district